Junior Alberto Moreno Paredes (born 3 March 2000) is a Venezuelan footballer who plays as a defender for Venezuelan Primera División side Caracas.

Club career
Moreno made his senior professional debut on 8 May 2017, playing 90 minutes in a 2–2 draw with Zamora FC.

Career statistics

Club

References

2000 births
Living people
Venezuelan footballers
Venezuela youth international footballers
Association football defenders
Trujillanos FC players
Caracas FC players
Venezuelan Primera División players
People from Valera
21st-century Venezuelan people